Baghdad Governorate ( Muḥāfaẓät Baġdād), also known as the Baghdad Province, is the capital governorate of Iraq. It includes the capital Baghdad as well as the surrounding metropolitan area. The governorate is one of two small provinces of all 19 in Iraq into which the country divides entirely, yet by a margin of almost three-to-one, the most populous.

Description 

Baghdad Governorate is one of the most developed parts of Iraq, with better infrastructure than much of Iraq, though heavily damaged from the US-led invasion in 2003 and continuing violence during the Iraq War. It used to have one of the highest rates for terrorism in the world with suicide bombers, however terrorist attacks have been rare since the territorial defeat of ISIL in Iraq in late 2017.

Baghdad has at least 12 bridges spanning the Tigris river - joining the east and west of the city. The governorate's northeast includes multiple Mesopotamian Marshes.

The Sadr City district is the most densely populated area in Iraq.

Province administration 

Baghdad is governed by the Baghdad Provincial Council. Representatives to the Baghdad Provincial Council were elected by their peers from the lower councils of the administrative districts in Baghdad in numbers proportional to the population of the various districts that were represented.

Government 
 Governor: Atwan Al Atwani
 Provincial Council Chairman (PCC): Riyadh Al Adhadh

Districts 
 Adhamiyah
 Karkh
 Karrada
 Kadhimiya
 Mansour
 Sadr City
 Al-Rashid
 Al-Rusafa
 New Baghdad

Demographics

See also

References

External links 
 http://www.humanitarianinfo.org/
 Baghdad-Denver Region Partnership

 
Governorates of Iraq